Marian Ulmer Gilman (July 2, 1914 – June 23, 1996), also known by her married name Marian Sharpe, was an American competition swimmer who represented the United States at the 1928 Summer Olympics in Amsterdam.  As a 14-year-old, Gilman placed fourth in the event final of the women's 100-meter backstroke with a time of 1:24.2.

Her brother, Ralph Gilman, swam for the United States in the 1936 Summer Olympics.

External links
 

1914 births
1996 deaths
American female backstroke swimmers
Olympic swimmers of the United States
Swimmers from Berkeley, California
Swimmers at the 1928 Summer Olympics
20th-century American women